Tod Township is one of the sixteen townships of Crawford County, Ohio, United States. As of the 2010 census the population was 677.

Geography
Located in the western part of the county, it borders the following townships:
Texas Township - north
Lykens Township - northeast corner
Holmes Township - east
Bucyrus Township - southeast
Dallas Township - south
Antrim Township, Wyandot County - southwest
Eden Township, Wyandot County - west
Sycamore Township, Wyandot County - northwest corner

No municipalities are located in Tod Township, although the unincorporated community of Oceola lies in the center of the township.

Name and history
Tod Township was named for David Tod, 25th Governor of Ohio.

It is the only Tod Township statewide.

Government
The township is governed by a three-member board of trustees, who are elected in November of odd-numbered years to a four-year term beginning on the following January 1. Two are elected in the year after the presidential election and one is elected in the year before it. There is also an elected township fiscal officer, who serves a four-year term beginning on April 1 of the year after the election, which is held in November of the year before the presidential election. Vacancies in the fiscal officership or on the board of trustees are filled by the remaining trustees.

References

External links
County website

Townships in Crawford County, Ohio
Townships in Ohio